Charles "Bert" Greene (born February 11, 1944) is an American professional golfer who played on the PGA Tour.

Greene was born in Gray, Georgia. He attended the University of Tennessee where he was a member of the golf team. He won the 1964 SEC Championship and was a third-team All-American in 1964 and 1965.

Greene turned professional in 1966. He played on the PGA Tour from 1967 to 1975. He won one Tour event, the 1973 Liggett Myers Open at MacGregor Downs Country Club in Cary, North Carolina, in a playoff with Miller Barber. He also finished second at the 1969 Westchester Classic, one stroke behind Frank Beard, and at the 1969 Tallahassee Open Invitational, one stroke behind Chuck Courtney. His best finish in a major was a third-place finish at the 1969 PGA Championship.

At a golf tournament in 1972, Greene was shot in the foot when a gun in his golf bag accidentally discharged.

Amateur wins
1963 Tennessee State Amateur
1964 SEC Championship

Professional wins (5)

PGA Tour wins (1)

PGA Tour playoff record (1–0)

Caribbean Tour wins (2)
1970 Los Lagartos Open
1971 Los Lagartos Open

South American wins (2) 
1970 Brazil Open
1971 Colombian Open

Results in major championships

Note: Greene never played in The Open Championship.

CUT = missed the half-way cut
"T" indicates a tie for a place

See also
1966 PGA Tour Qualifying School graduates

References

External links

American male golfers
Tennessee Volunteers men's golfers
PGA Tour golfers
Golfers from Georgia (U.S. state)
People from Gray, Georgia
Golfers from Knoxville, Tennessee
1944 births
Living people